The Filzen Saddle is a mountain pass,  high, between Saalfelden am Steinernen Meer near Hinterthal/Maria Alm in the Pinzgau region and Dienten am Hochkönig in the Pongau in the Austrian federal state of Salzburg. The B 164 crosses the saddle linking Saalfelden via the Dienten Saddle and Bischofshofen.

The Filzen Saddle is the lowest crossing between the Filzenkopf to the north and the Gabühel southwest of the saddle.

References 

Mountain passes of the Alps
Berchtesgaden Alps
Salzburg Slate Alps
Mountain passes of Salzburg (state)
Zell am See District
St. Johann im Pongau District